Thomas, Tom or Tommy White may refer to:

Entertainment
 Thomas White (musician) (born 1984), British musician
 Tom White (film), 2004 Australian drama film
 Tommy White (artist), see List of Guggenheim Fellowships awarded in 2007
 Tommy White, a character in A-Haunting We Will Go

Military
 Thomas White (patriot) (1739–1820), American soldier in General Washington's army
 Thomas D. White (1902–1965), Chief of Staff of the United States Air Force
 Thomas E. White (born 1943), 18th United States Secretary of the Army
 Tom Warren White (1902–1993), Australian Army officer

Politics

U.K.
 Thomas White (MP for Rochester), Member of Parliament (MP) for Rochester, 1378–1388
 Thomas White (MP for Leominster), MP for Leominster, 1399
 Thomas White (MP for Lewes), MP for Lewes, 1420–1435
 Thomas White (died 1542), MP for Bristol
 Thomas White (died 1558) (1532/4–1558), MP for Downton
 Thomas White (died 1566) (1507–1566), MP for Hampshire 
 Thomas White (died 1590), MP for Poole
 Thomas White of Tuxford (died 1580), English state official
 Thomas White (died 1670) (c. 1630–1670), Member of Parliament for Wells
 Thomas White (1667–1732), Member of Parliament for East Retford
 Sir Thomas White, 2nd Baronet (1801–1882)
 Sir Thomas Woollaston White, 1st Baronet (died 1817)
 Sir Thomas Astley Woollaston White, 5th Baronet (1904–1996)
 Sir Thomas Woollaston White, 3rd Baronet (1828–1907), of the White baronets

U.S.
 Thomas White (California politician), mayor of San Jose, California from 1851 to 1854
 Thomas White Jr. (1939–2010), New York politician
 Thomas White (Michigan politician) (died 1868), Michigan state representative
 Tom White (Nebraska politician) (born 1956), Nebraska state senator
 Thomas W. White (born 1805), Michigan state representative
 Thomas W. White (born 1937), Michigan state representative

Elsewhere
 Thomas White (Canadian politician) (1830–1888), Canadian politician
 Thomas White (Australian politician) (1888–1957), Australian politician

Religion
 Thomas White (benefactor) (1550–1624), clergyman and founder of Sion College
 Thomas White (scholar) (1593–1676), Catholic philosopher
 Thomas White (bishop) (1628–1698), Bishop of Peterborough (1685–1690)
 Thomas Penny White (1777–1845), English clergyman
 Thomas A. White (1931–2017), Irish Roman Catholic prelate, Apostolic Nuncio (1978–1996)
 Thomas Joseph White, American Roman Catholic priest

Sports

Football
 Tommy White (footballer, born 1881) (1881–?), English footballer for Stockport County
 Tommy White (footballer, born 1908) (1908–1967), Everton and England footballer
 Tom White (footballer, born 1896) (1896–1960), English football full-back for Birmingham and Newport County
 Tom White (footballer, born 1924) (1924–1998), English footballer for Sunderland
 Tom White (footballer, born 1939), Scottish footballer
 Tom White (footballer, born 1976), English football defender for Bristol Rovers, Hereford United and Yeovil Town
 Tom White (footballer, born 1997), English footballer for Barrow
 Thomas White (footballer), English footballer
 Tom White (rugby), English rugby union and rugby league footballer who played in the 1900s and 1910s
 Tom White (rugby league, born 1893) (1893–1927), English rugby league footballer who played in the 1910s and 1920s
 Tom White (American football official), American football official

Other sports
 Thomas White (cricketer, born c. 1740) (1740–1831), English cricketer for Surrey and Kent
 Thomas White (Sussex cricketer) (1892–1979), English cricketer
 Thomas White (speed skater) (born 1915), Canadian speed skater
 Tom White (athlete) (1917–1985), British Olympic athlete
 Tom White (hurler), Irish hurler
 Tommy White (baseball)

Others
 Thomas White (merchant) (1492–1567), founder of St. John's College, Oxford
 Thomas White (pirate) (died 1708), English pirate active in the Indian Ocean
 Thomas Raeburn White (1875–1959), American attorney, newspaper publisher, and law professor
 Thomas P. White (1888–1968), California Supreme Court Justice
 Thomas Blanco White (1915–2006), British patent lawyer
 Thomas S. White Jr. (born 1943), American asset manager
 Thomas White (architect) (died 1738), British architect of St Mary and St Margaret's Church, Castle Bromwich
 Thomas H. White (1836–1914), American businessman; founder of White Sewing Machine Company and co-founder of White Motor Company
 Thomas J. White (1920–2011), American businessman
 C. Thomas White, American judge in Nebraska
 Thomas Bruce White Sr., American law officer and prison warden

See also
 Thomas Wight (disambiguation)
 Thomas Whyte (disambiguation)